Drums of the Desert is a 1927 American silent Western film directed by John Waters and written by Zane Grey and John Stone. The film stars Warner Baxter, Marietta Millner, Ford Sterling, Wallace MacDonald, Heinie Conklin, George Irving, and Bernard Siegel. The film was released on June 4, 1927, by Paramount Pictures.

Cast 
 Warner Baxter as John Curry
 Marietta Millner as Mary Manton
 Ford Sterling as Perkins
 Wallace MacDonald as Will Newton
 Heinie Conklin as Hi-Lo
 George Irving as Professor Elias Manton
 Bernard Siegel as Chief Brave Bear
 Guy Oliver as Indian Agent

References

External links 
 
 
 lobby long poster

1927 films
1927 Western (genre) films
Paramount Pictures films
Films directed by John Waters (director born 1893)
American black-and-white films
Silent American Western (genre) films
1920s English-language films
1920s American films